Albert Hatton (1879–1963) was an English professional footballer who played as a wing half.

References

1879 births
1963 deaths
People from Nottingham
English footballers
Association football wing halves
Sutton Junction F.C. players
Grimsby Town F.C. players
Crystal Palace F.C. players
Aberdare Town F.C. players
Rotherham Town F.C. (1899) players
English Football League players